The 2010–11 Yemeni League was the 19th edition of top-level football in Yemen.

The season started in November 2010 and lasted until June 2011. The league winners qualified for the AFC Cup. The bottom four teams were relegated.

Teams
Al-Shula, Al-Wahda Aden, Salam Al-Garfa and Al Yarmuk Al Rawda were relegated to the second tier after finishing in the bottom four places of the 2009–10 Yemeni League season. They were replaced by Al-Sha'ab Hadramaut, Hassan Abyan, Al Rasheed Ta'izz and Al Sha'ab Sana'a.

Three teams represented the capital San'a and the city of Ta'izz, bringing big rivalries to the game.

Stadia and locations

League standings

Season statistics

Top scorers

Yemeni League seasons
Yem
1